Gnidenko or Hnidenko is a gender-neutral Slavic surname that may refer to:

Dmytro Hnidenko (born 1975), Ukrainian weightlifter
Ekaterina Gnidenko (born 1992), Russian track cyclist

Russian-language surnames
Ukrainian-language surnames